Air Vice Marshal David John Stubbs,  is a senior Royal Air Force officer. He previously served as the Commandant of Royal Air Force College Cranwell from 2012 to 2013, and the Air Secretary from 2013 to 2016.

Military career
From 2006 to 2008, Stubbs was Commanding Officer of RAF Aldergrove and the Senior RAF Officer for Northern Ireland. He served as Commandant of Royal Air Force College Cranwell from March 2012 to November 2013. In November 2013, he was appointed Air Secretary.

Stubbs was appointed Companion of the Order of the Bath (CB) in the 2016 Birthday Honours.

Personal life
Stubbs is Chairman of the Board of Trustees of the RAF Club, a gentlemen's club in London.

References

 

 
 

|-
 
 

Living people
Officers of the Order of the British Empire
Royal Air Force air marshals
Companions of the Order of the Bath
Commandants of the Royal Air Force College Cranwell
Year of birth missing (living people)